The 2014 Campeonato Brasileiro Série A was the 58th edition of the Campeonato Brasileiro Série A, the top-level of professional football in Brazil. Cruzeiro, the defending champions, won the title for the second time in a row and the fourth time overall. The championship had a break between the ninth and tenth rounds due to the 2014 FIFA World Cup, which was held between June and July in Brazil.Cruzeiro took the lead in round 6 and from then on, stayed in that position, winning the title after a 2–1 victory over Goiás in the Mineirão stadium, in round 36.

On the other side of the table, Criciúma, that had been in the relegation zone since round 17, and held the last place since round 30, was relegated after a 1–1 draw against Flamengo, also in round 36. In the following round, Botafogo was relegated after losing to Santos by 2–0. In the last round, Palmeiras, despite only obtaining a draw in its last match, against Atlético Paranaense, guaranteed its survival in the first division after defeats of its competitors, Vitória and Bahia.

Format
For the twelfth consecutive season, the tournament was played in a double round-robin system. The team with the most points at the end of the season is declared champion, while the bottom four teams are relegated and play in the Campeonato Brasileiro Série B in the 2015 season.

International qualification
The Série A serves as a qualifier to CONMEBOL's 2015 Copa Libertadores. The top-three teams in the standings qualify to the Second Stage of the competition, while the fourth place in the standings qualify to the First Stage.

Teams and location

Number of teams by state

Average attendance

Personnel and kits

League table

Positions by round

Results

Season statistics

Scoring

Top scorers

Hat-tricks

Clean sheets
Most clean sheets: 14
Grêmio
Fewest clean sheets: 4
Vitória

References

External links

2014 Campeonato Brasileiro Série A at Soccerway

 

Campeonato Brasileiro Série A seasons
1